The 1946 Allen Yellow Jackets football team was an American football team that represented Allen University of Columbia, South Carolina, in the Southeastern Athletic Conference (SEAC) during the 1946 college football season. William "Buster" Lawson and Hooks Nelson were the team's coaches. The team compiled an 8–2 record, won the SEAA championship and outscored opponents by a total of 244 to 43. The Yellow Jackets lost the first two games of the season and then won the remain eight games, including a victory over Fayetteville State in the Piedmont Tobacco Bowl.

The Dickinson System rated Allen as the No. 11 black college football team for 1946.

Schedule

References

Allen
Allen Yellow Jackets football seasons
Allen Yellow Jackets football